Dapiprazole (brand name Rev-Eyes) is an alpha-1 blocker. It is used to reverse mydriasis after eye examination.

References 

Alpha-1 blockers
Phenylpiperazines
Triazolopyridines
Ophthalmology drugs
2-Tolyl compounds